Jacinto Chacón Barrios (16 August 1820 – 1893) was a Chilean politician of the Liberal Party. He served as the deputy for San Felipe, Santiago from 1885 to 1888.

References 

People from Santiago Province, Chile
Politicians from Santiago
Liberal Party (Chile, 1849) politicians
1820 births
1893 deaths